The 1968–69 Midland Football League season was the 69th in the history of the Midland Football League, a football competition in England.

Clubs
The league featured 14 clubs which competed in the previous season, along with four new clubs:
Ashby Institute, joined from the Lincolnshire League
Barton Town, transferred from the Yorkshire Football League
Boston, joined from the Eastern Counties League
Warley, promoted from the West Midlands (Regional) League Division One

League table

References

External links

Midland Football League (1889)
M